Howard Schomer (June 9, 1915 – June 28, 2001) was a United Nations Commission on Human Rights aide, civil rights activist, scholar, drafter of the Universal Declaration of Human Rights, and editor-at-large for The Christian Century. He received a B.S. from Harvard College in 1937; a D.D. from the Chicago Theological Seminary in 1954, and was ordained as a minister in the United Church of Christ in 1941. He was assigned to Civilian Public Service for refusing his ministerial exemption from the draft in World War II as a conscientious objector. Schomer was a close associate of Martin Luther King Jr. and remained a civil rights activist for his entire life.

He served as the Chicago Theological Seminary president from (1959–1966).

References

1915 births
2001 deaths
Harvard University alumni
American civil rights activists
Chicago Theological Seminary alumni
American conscientious objectors
American officials of the United Nations